Richard Henry Dana Sr. (November 15, 1787 – February 2, 1879) was an American poet, critic and lawyer. His son, Richard Henry Dana Jr., also became a lawyer and author.

Biography
Richard Henry Dana was born in Cambridge, Massachusetts on November 15, 1787, and was the son of Federalist judge Francis Dana. He graduated from Harvard College and became a lawyer. He married Ruth Charlotte Smith and they had four children including Richard Henry Dana Jr. Despite having graduated from there, Dana accused Harvard of smothering genius, and believed that the minds of poets were more insightful than the general community. He seldom practiced law.

Between 1817 and 1827, he was the first American to write major critiques of Romanticism, though his views were unconventional for his time. In a review of the poetry of Washington Allston, he noted his belief that poetry was the highest form of art, though it should be simple and must avoid didacticism. Dana also criticized the Transcendentalism movement. He wrote, "Emerson & the other Spiritualists, or Supernaturalists, or whatever they are called, or may be pleased to call themselves... [have] madness in their hearts". Dana was a member of the Anthology Club. In 1817, he and others in the club founded the North American Review as an outlet for his criticism, though he lost editorial control of it on account of his opposition to standard conventions. Though some of his criticisms were controversial when first published, by 1850 his opinions were conventional. As he wrote at the time, "Much that was once held to be presumptuous novelty... [became] little better than commonplace".

As a writer of fiction, Dana was an early practitioner of Gothic literature, particularly with his novel Paul Felton (1822), a tale of madness and murder. The novel has also been called a pioneering work of psychological realism alongside works by William Gilmore Simms. Dana had difficulty supporting his family through his writing, which earned him only $400 over 30 years. In 1849, he was elected into the National Academy of Design as an Honorary Academician.

Dana died on February 2, 1879, and was buried in the family plot at the Old Burying Ground next to the First Parish in Cambridge.

Works
 An oration, delivered before the Washington benevolent society at Cambridge, July 4, 1814. Printed by Hilliard and Metcalf, 1814.
 The Idle Man. v.1 (1821-1822)
 Paul Felton (1822)

References

External links

 WorldCat
 
 Richard Henry Dana Sr. at Lawyers and Poetry

1787 births
1879 deaths
19th-century American poets
American male poets
19th century in Boston
People from Beacon Hill, Boston
Lawyers from Boston
Writers from Cambridge, Massachusetts
Harvard College alumni
Writers from Boston
Lawyers from Cambridge, Massachusetts
19th-century American male writers
19th-century American lawyers
Dana family